The list of shipwrecks in 1952 includes ships sunk, foundered, grounded, or otherwise lost during 1952.

January

9 January

10 January

13 January

14 January

17 January

20 January

22 January

24 January

28 January

February

1 February

11 February

12 February

13 February

15 February

18 February

19 February

25 February

March

12 March

April

3 April

5 April

15 April

23 April

26 April

Unknown date

May

4 May

7 May

|

8 May

10 May

11 May

20 May

21 May

30 May

June

3 June

5 June

27 June

30 June

July

6 July

10 July

14 July

22 July

25 July

Unknown date

August

1 August

3 August

5 August

6 August

8 August

10 August

15 August

17 August

20 August

28 August

Unknown date

September

1 September

4 September

5 September

7 September

9 September

19 September

22 September

23 September

24 September

25 September

28 September

29 September

30 September

Unknown date

October

1 October

2 October

3 October

8 October

11 October

18 October

November

5 November

6 November

18 November

21 November

24 November

Unknown date

December

3 December

10 December

11 December

15 December

17 December

18 December

21 December

22 December

23 December

24 December

27 December

28 December

29 December

Unknown date

References

See also 

1952
 
Ships